

See also
List of monastic houses in Ireland

Notes

References

Monastic houses
Monastic houses
Tyrone
Monastic houses